Papatzindan de Romero (El Limon) is located in Michoacán, in Mexico, in the municipality of Tiquicheo de Nicolas Romero.

Its altitude is 600 meters. 
Papatzindan de Romero (El Limon) and has a population of 1,548. About 45 percent of the local population are children. 
Even though the medium time spent at school is 4.51 years, there are still about 295 individuals who are illiterate, unable to read and write. 
Altogether, there are eight people from indigenous origins and five individuals who are still able to speak an indigenous language

Populated places in Michoacán